Francis William Browne, 4th Baron Kilmaine   (24 March 1843 – 9 November 1907) was an Anglo-Irish politician and landowner. He was an Irish representative peer and Sheriff of County Westmeath in 1870.

Life
Browne was born in London, the eldest son of John Cavendish Browne, 3rd Baron Kilmaine, and his second wife, Mary Law, daughter of politician Charles Ewan Law (by his father's first wife, he had three half-brothers who died unmarried before their father.) He succeeded to his father's title in 1873.  He held  in Ireland, and was a member of gentlemen's clubs in both London and Dublin.

He was elected as an Irish representative peer, holding that role from 1890 until his death.  He was appointed as High Sheriff of County Westmeath in 1870.

Personal life
In 1877, Browne married Alice Emily, daughter of Col. Dean Shute, sister of Sir Cameron Shute, and niece of General Sir Charles Cameron Shute. They had one son, John Edward Deane Browne, who married Lady Aline Kennedy, daughter of the 3rd Marquess of Ailsa.

He had a residence in Pau, and sponsored a golfing tournament there, with the Kilmaine Cup as prize.

Lord Kilmaine killed himself in Paris in November 1907 by jumping from the fourth-floor of the Hotel d'Iéna. He had reportedly suffered from "acute nervous disease" and chronic sleeplessness, and had gone to Paris for treatment. His wife was in the room when he jumped and witnessed him go to the window as if to look out, before suddenly throwing himself out. He died instantly from a skull fracture. His body was brought back to Ireland for burial.

References 
 

1843 births
19th-century Anglo-Irish people
Francis
Irish Anglicans
Barons in the Peerage of Ireland
High Sheriffs of County Westmeath
Irish representative peers
British politicians who committed suicide
Suicides by jumping in France
1907 deaths
1907 suicides